Fudgie the Whale is a type of ice cream cake produced and sold by Carvel in its franchise stores. It was developed by Carvel in the 1970s as an expansion of its line of freshly made products, along with Hug Me the Bear and Cookie Puss.

Development
Although the cake depicts the shape of a whale and was originally decorated as such, it was  sometimes adapted for holiday uses by rotating it 90 degrees counter-clockwise so that the whale's body, now upright, could represent a face. The whale's tail would then represent whatever a character traditionally had on its head: the Easter Bunny's ears, or a Santa Claus' tassel. But Fudgie the Whale was usually promoted around Father's Day, using the slogan, "For a whale of a dad."

Fudgie was developed by founder Tom Carvel, with the assistance of his employee Kathy Dumas.

Partnerships / Co-branding
In 2018, Captain Lawrence Brewing Company partnered with Carvel to produce, in limited release, "Fudgie the Beer", a stout flavored with the chocolate crunchies also used to make Fudgie the Whale.  The beer was re-released in limited quantities in 2019 to coincide with Father's Day, and was again re-released in June 2021 for the same reason. It was even on The Office, Andy Bernard said “I want a Fudgie The Whale.”

In media

In the FX series Archer, title character Sterling Archer refers to Cookie Puss and Fudgie the Whale in "Drift Problem" (Season 3, Episode 7), wondering aloud to himself if either will be present at the surprise birthday party he assumes is being held for him "I wonder what the guys in the office have planned for my birthday. Wonder if Fudgie the Whale will be there or Cookie Puss. Cookie Puss. Those guys at Carvel know what they’re doing". Additionally, in "Heart of Archness: Part 1" (Season 3, Episode 1), Ray Gillette moans "Cookie Puss" after he is informed there will be no Carvel. The dessert is referred to yet again in “House Call” (Season 5, Episode 4), when Mallory Archer minimizes concern for Pam’s cocaine addiction, stating that Pam’s obituary would otherwise read the same had “the word cocaine been replaced with Cookie Puss”.

In season 4, episode 11 of The Office, Andy Bernard states that his favorite type of cake is ice cream cake, and that he would like a "Fudgie the Whale" cake.

In season 8, episode 6 of The Simpsons ("A Milhouse Divided"), Homer buys Marge a Fudgie the Whale wedding cake with "To a Whale of a Wife" written in icing, much to her dismay and disappointment.

In season 11, episode 2 of Mystery Science Theater 3000 (Cry Wilderness), during the invention exchange, Kinga Forrester and Max unveiled the Fudgie the Whale cake clock which included a money bag cake. In response to the episode, Carvel posted on Twitter a picture of a money bag cake.

On The Dan Le Batard Show, Old Money Charlie ate an entire Fudgie the Whale cake as a 'Grid of Death' punishment.  The size of the cake was called into question by the shipping container, and referred to as "Fudgie the Dolphin."

In season two, episode 14 of Speechless, JJ DiMeo demands a "Fudgie the Whale" cake for his 18th birthday.

Every year for his birthday, the station manager at WFAN in New York, buys Boomer Esiason a Fudgie the Whale cake. Boomer hosts "Boomer and Gio in the Morning" from 6am - 10am EST.

In season 3, episode 5 of Showtime's hour long drama entitled Billions, a reference is made regarding Fudgie the Whale as the Axe Capital office group is gathering for an announcement from Dollar Bill. Ben Kim asks what this is all about and Mafee insinuates it's someone birthday. He then states that they are all getting a Fudgie the Whale. Kim then replies that he's 99 percent sure that Mafee is lying but the one percent is bursting with hope that he is not.

In season 2, episode 3 of HBO's show Looking, which takes place in San Francisco, a coworker receives a Fudgie the Whale cake during a birthday celebration and exclaims, "What'd you guys do, ship this from Long Island?"

In season 1, episode 18 "And the One Night Stands" of the show 2 Broke Girls, Max Black (Kat Dennings) reminisces about eating "Fudgie the Whale" on her birthday which she spent alone while her crackheaded mother passed out and forgot to invite people for her birthday party. At the end of the episode, she insists on everyone in the prison-bus getting themselves the ice-cream cake.

See also

 Cookie Puss
 Carvel
 Ice cream

References

External links
Carvel.com official website

Ice cream brands
Fictional whales
Products introduced in 1976
Mascots introduced in 1976
Fictional food characters
Animal mascots
No bake cakes